"Do You Really Want Me (Show Respect)" is a song by Swedish singer and songwriter Robyn, released as the second single from her first album, Robyn Is Here. It was released first time in 1995 and was a top 10 hit in Denmark, Norway and Sweden. The single was also a top 20 hit in Iceland. On the Eurochart Hot 100, the song peaked at number 60 in December 1995. It was not released in the United Kingdom or the United States until 1998. In the US, it was Robyn's final single release there until her 2008 comeback. It was also the final single release from Robyn for nine years in the UK until "Konichiwa Bitches" was released as the first single from her fourth album, Robyn in 2007.

Critical reception
Larry Flick from Billboard described the song as a "engaging third single from her fun debut", noting that "in its original Ulf Lindstrom/Johan Ekhé production, the song is a chipper, hip hop-inflected ditty with infectious kid-pop energy and a nursery rhyme-like hook. Recut with Q.D.3 at the helm, it has become a sultry, Teena Marie-esque soul shuffler that's clearly designed to attract an older and more varied audience to the party." He added that "in fact, it leaves you properly intrigued and anxious to hear more." Pan-European magazine Music & Media commented that "the part nagging/part soulful vocals of this Swedish singer and the mid-tempo groove that comfortably chugs along make for a pleasant and casual pop/dance tune." Later in 1998, when released in the UK, Music & Media stated that the new version is a "lush midtempo ballad".

Chart performance
In Sweden, "Do You Really Want Me" became Robyn's second top 10 hit, peaking at number 2, becoming her highest-charting single until "Dancing on My Own" entered the charts at number 2 for two weeks in 2010. In the US, the single was not as popular as her previous two hits, "Show Me Love" and "Do You Know (What it Takes)", peaking at number 10 on the Pop Songs airplay chart. In the UK, "Do You Really Want Me" became Robyn's second biggest hit, peaking at number 20, her second of two top 20 hits there from Robyn Is Here. The song also peaked at number 43 in New Zealand.

Music video
There were made two different music videos of the song; one for the 1995 version and one for the 1998 version.

Track listing

UK single
CD 1
 "Do You Really Want Me (Show Respect)" (single edit)
 "Do You Really Want Me (Show Respect)" (QD3 edit)
 "Do You Really Want Me (Show Respect)" (So Groovy mix)
 "Robyn Is Here"

CD 2
 "Do You Really Want Me (Show Respect)" (single edit)
 "Do You Really Want Me (Show Respect)" (Smooth Butter mix)
 "Do You Really Want Me (Show Respect)" (Mad Love mix)
 "Do You Really Want Me (Show Respect)" (Gecko's Urban mix)
 "Do You Really Want Me (Show Respect)" (Daddy C's Mekka mix)

Sweden single
CD maxi-single
 "Do You Really Want Me (Show Respect)" (Daddy C's Mekka Mix) – 6:07
 "Do You Really Want Me (Show Respect)" (Smooth Butter Mix) – 4:56
 "Do You Really Want Me (Show Respect)" (Mad Love Mix) – 3:53
 "Do You Really Want Me (Show Respect)" (Gecko's Urban Mix) – 5:55

Personnel
Lyrics – Robyn
Music and vocal arrangement – Robyn, Ulf Lindström, Johan Ekhé
Arrangement and production – Ulf Lindström, Johan Ekhé

Source:

Charts and certifications

Weekly charts

Year-end charts

Certifications

References

1995 singles
1998 singles
Robyn songs
Music videos directed by Francis Lawrence
Songs written by Johan Ekhé
Song recordings produced by Ghost (production team)
Songs written by Robyn
1995 songs
Songs written by Ulf Lindström